Ralph Leon Beals (July 19, 1901 – February 24, 1985) was an anthropologist at the University of California, Los Angeles, a former president of the American Anthropological Association, and the recipient of a Guggenheim Fellowship. He worked on community development in Egypt with UNESCO and studied Mexican students in American universities. His brother was journalist Carleton Beals.

Further reading 

 
 
 

1901 births
1985 deaths
University of California, Los Angeles faculty
20th-century American anthropologists